The Emily Post Institute (EPI) is an organization located in Burlington, Vermont, that provides etiquette advice and training to news outlets and corporations in the United States of America and worldwide. Founded by etiquette author Emily Post and her son Ned in 1946, the Institute has been maintained and evolved through subsequent generations of the Post family.

The company offers in-person and virtual workshops and seminars on topics such as dining etiquette, communication skills, and social media etiquette.

References

External links
Official website
Etiquette Daily

Organizations based in Burlington, Vermont
Organizations established in 1946
Etiquette